Sairi Saroha is a village in Kallar Syedan. It is 3 km from Kallar Syedan. it has a population of 500 people with 80 houses. Nearby villages are Loni (Looni Salyal), Paikan, and Bimma Gangal.

Populated places in Kallar Syedan Tehsil